A.P.C.Veerabahu Matriculation Higher Secondary School is in Tuticorin, Tamil Nadu, India. It was established by Kulapathy A.P.C Veerabahu in 1993.

When it was started in Thoothukudi it had less than 500 children but in 2014 it has more than 2500.

References

High schools and secondary schools in Tamil Nadu
Education in Thoothukudi
Educational institutions established in 1993
1993 establishments in Tamil Nadu